So'tekizan Korinji (祖的山光林寺), Korinji for short, is a Rinzai Zen Buddhist monastery (sodo) in the Upper Midwest region of the United States near Madison, Wisconsin. The Korinji Foundation, a not-for-profit charitable organization, was founded in 2005 to fund Korinji's construction and to support its future residents.  of forested land were purchased by the Foundation for this purpose in 2008.

According to the Korinji website, groundbreaking occurred in June, 2009 and Korinji was officially dedicated on November 3, 2013, with the completion of its training hall. Meido Moore Roshi, a student of the Rinzai Zen teachers Tenzan Toyoda Rokoji, Dogen Hosokawa Roshi, and So'zan Miller Roshi, was installed as the first abbot; these teachers all carry the lineage of Omori Sogen Roshi, a well-known Japanese Zen master who was a successor of the Tenryu-ji line of Zen. In March 2018 Korinji's residential quarters were completed and the first period of formal monastic training began. 

Korinji serves as the headquarters and spiritual center of a larger association of Zen practice groups called The Rinzai Zen Community, with the nearby Madison Rinzai Zen Community being its primary branch. Other branches are located throughout N. America and in Europe. The monastery also houses Korinji Shugen Dojo, a Shugendo training center.

See also
Buddhism in the United States
Glossary of Japanese Buddhism
Timeline of Zen Buddhism in the United States

External links
 Korinji Monastery
 Meido Moore Bio via Shambala Publications

Asian-American culture in Wisconsin
Zen centers in the United States
Buddhist temples in Wisconsin